Kristrup Boldklub is a Danish amateur football club located in Kristrup, a suburb to Randers.

History 

Kristrup Boldklub was founded in 1908,  and was accepted to JBU in 1922. It's one of the oldest Danish football clubs.

On the club's 100th year anniversary, Randers FC and Brøndby IF played a charity match, which had more than 1.700 spectators, also the highest attendance ever at Kristrup Stadion.

The club first team is in the series 1, which is the 6th ranked league in Denmark.

In 2003 the club went into a merger, and is one of the 6 founding clubs to Randers FC.

Colours 
Kristrup's colours is red and white.

Stadium 
Kristrup Boldklub plays their home matches on Kristrup Stadion.

Achievements

Noted players 
Listed according to when they debuted for Kristrup BK (year in parentheses):

External links 
 Kristrup Boldklub – official site
 Randers FC – official site

References 

Football clubs in Denmark
Association football clubs established in 1908
1908 establishments in Denmark